Dysoptus chiquitus is a species of moth in the family Arrhenophanidae. It is widespread in a large part of the Neotropical lowland wet forests, from Costa Rica south to Mato Grosso in southern Brazil.

The length of the forewings is 4.6-6.5 mm for males and 7-7.2 for females. Adults are probably active during most months of the year throughout their range. Records include January–March, May, August and September.

External links
Family Arrhenophanidae

Dysoptus
Moths described in 1914